Center for Middle Eastern Studies may refer to:

 Center for Middle Eastern Studies at the University of Chicago
 Center for Middle Eastern Studies at Lund University